Taeniospora is a genus of anamorphic fungi in the family Atheliaceae. The genus contains two species that have been recorded from the Czech Republic.

References

External links

Atheliales